is a common masculine Japanese given name.

Possible writings
Kenzō can be written using different kanji characters and can mean:
賢三, "wise, three"
健三, "healthy, three"
謙三, "humble, three"
健想, "healthy, concept"
建造, "build, create"
健蔵, "healthy, storehouse"
憲蔵, "constitution, storehouse"
研造, "polish, create"
The name can also be written in hiragana or katakana.

People

Emperor Kenzō (顕宗, born 5 AD), 23rd Japanese imperial ruler
Adachi Kenzō (謙蔵, 1864–1948), Japanese politician
Kenzo Fujisue (健三, born 1964), Japanese politician
, Japanese sport wrestler
Kenzo Kitakata (born 1947), Japanese novelist
Kenzō Kotani (1909–2003), last Yasukuni Shrine swordsmith
Kenzo Mori (1914–2007), Japanese-Canadian journalist and editor
Kenzo Nakamura (兼三, born 1973), retired judoka
William K. Nakamura (1922–1944), United States Army soldier
Kenzo Nambu (born 1992), Japanese footballer
Kenzo Okada (1902–1982), American painter of Japanese birth
Kenzo Oshima (賢三, born 1943), Permanent Representative of Japan to the United Nations
, Japanese handball player
Kenzo Suzuki (健想, born 1974), Japanese professional wrestler
Kenzo Suzuki (astronomer) (憲蔵), a Japanese astronomer
Kenzo Takada (賢三, 1939–2020), Japanese fashion designer
Tamoto Kenzō (研造, 1832–1912), Japanese photographer
Kenzo Tange (健三, 1913–2005), Japanese architect
Kenzo Yokoyama (謙三, born 1943), retired Japanese football player
Kenzō Masaoka (1898–1988), 1930s-1940s animation creator
Kenzo Taniguchi (born 1988), Japanese football player for FC Kagoshima
Kenzo Ohashi (born 1934), Japanese football player

Other
Kenzo (brand), a French fashion label named after Japanese designer Kenzo Takada
5526 Kenzo, a Main-belt Asteroid

Japanese masculine given names